Sun Yirang (1848–1908) was a Qing dynasty Chinese philologist. A native of Wenzhou, Zhejiang province, he retired from official employment early in his life to devote himself to scholarship. His most important works are Mozi Jiangu (墨子間詁), a corrected, definitive edition of Mozi, and Zhouli Zhengyi (周禮正義), an important commentary on the Rites of Zhou. He also contributed to the studies of the bronzeware script and oracle script. His work Qiwen Juli (契文舉例), published posthumously by Luo Zhenyu, was the first work of decipherment of the oracle bone script.

Bibliography
 『墨子間詁』 (Mozi Jiangu)
 『周礼正義』 (Zhouli Zhengyi)
 『古籀拾遺』
 『古籀余論』
 『契文挙例』 (Qiwen Juli)
 『名原』
 『尚書駢枝』
 『札迻』
 『籀廎述林』

References
He Jiuying 何九盈 (1995). Zhongguo gudai yuyanxue shi (中囯古代语言学史 "A history of ancient Chinese linguistics"). Guangzhou: Guangdong jiaoyu chubanshe.
Zhongguo da baike quanshu (1980–1993). 1st Edition. Beijing; Shanghai: Zhongguo da baike quanshu chubanshe.

External links
 Biography at Guoxue
 Mozi Jiangu and other works by Sun Yirang at Chinese Text Project

1848 births
1908 deaths
Linguists from China
Qing dynasty writers
Writers from Wenzhou
Scientists from Wenzhou